The Clarkson Golden Knights women's ice hockey program represented Clarkson University during the 2012–13 NCAA Division I women's ice hockey season.  The Golden Knights finished runners-up during the regular season in the ECAC to Cornell. They advanced to the semifinals of the ECAC tournament where they lost to Harvard Crimson. Their efforts were good enough to earn them an at-large bid to the NCAA tournament, where they lost to national runners-up Boston University in the quarterfinals.

Offseason

Recruiting

Schedule

|-
!colspan=12 style=""| Regular Season

|-
!colspan=12 style=""| ECAC Hockey Tournament

|-
!colspan=12 style=""| NCAA Tournament

Awards and honors

 Erin Ambrose – ECAC Hockey Rookie of the Year,  ECAC Hockey Second Team All-Star, ECAC Hockey All-Rookie Team, ECAC Hockey Rookie of the Month (October, December, February), ECAC Hockey Rookie of the Week (10/23, 10/30, 2/12), ECAC Hockey weekly Honor Roll (10/9, 12/11, 1/14, 1/21, 2/18)
 Renata Fast – ECAC Hockey weekly Honor Roll (11/20, 2/4)
 Emily Horn – ECAC Hockey weekly Honor Roll (10/16)
 Erica Howe – ECAC Hockey Goaltender of the Year, ECAC Hockey First Team All-Star, ECAC Hockey Goaltender of the Month (October, November), ECAC Hockey Goaltender of the Week (10/9, 11/5, 11/20, 1/14, 1/28, 2/25), ECAC Hockey weekly Honor Roll (10/23, 10/30, 11/13, 12/3, 12/11, 1/21, 2/4, 2/12, 2/18)
 Shannon MacAulay – ECAC Hockey Rookie of the Week (10/16, 11/13), ECAC Hockey weekly Honor Roll (12/3, 1/28)
 Carly Mercer – ECAC Hockey Third Team All-Star, ECAC Hockey Player of the Week (1/28), ECAC Hockey weekly Honor Roll (10/23, 11/13, 12/11, 2/18)
 Olivia Howe – ECAC Hockey weekly Honor Roll (11/5, 2/25)
 Vanessa Plante – ECAC Hockey weekly Honor Roll (11/5)
 Jamie Lee Rattray – ECAC Hockey Second Team All-Star, ECAC Hockey Player of the Week (10/23), ECAC Hockey weekly Honor Roll (10/16, 11/20, 2/25)
 Danielle Skirrow – ECAC Hockey weekly Honor Roll (10/9, 1/21, 2/12)
 Brittany Styner – ECAC Hockey weekly Honor Roll (1/14, 2/4)

References

External links
Official site

Clarkson Golden Knights women's ice hockey seasons
Clarkson